John Bauer (born 6 January 1978), is a South African ceramist. He lives in Muizenberg with a studio at the Montebello Design Centre in Newlands (Cape Town).

Early life
Bauer was born to a middle-class family in Port Elizabeth, Eastern Cape. In 1983, both his mother and grandmother were run over and killed by a drunken driver. During his early twenties his surviving grandmother was murdered. This event has had an impact on his work.

In 1985, Bauer’s father, an academic, decided to put unhappy associations behind him, and the family started a new life in Newlands, Cape Town. Bauer attended Westerford High School where his severe dyslexia remained undiagnosed, and the resultant academic difficulties induced an enduring aversion to reading.  Loath to participate in organized sport, Bauer started pottery classes in the afternoon when he was thirteen, and his talents were soon recognized by his teacher.

Whilst still at school, Bauer consolidated an ongoing friendship with the minister of the local Presbyterian congregational parish, and the church and pastor exercised a strong formative influence, imbuing him with a highly idealistic and humanitarian streak.

Work and influences
After matriculating, Bauer realized pottery was his vocation and, after overcoming his father’s objections, he studied with a variety of local potters before striking out on his own. Despite initial financial problems and very real privation, his commitment to the kiln remained absolute, and no subsequent hardship has ever deflected him from his course.

John Bauer has devoted his career to investigating the nature of porcelain and exploring its full potential as an artistic medium.  He ceaselessly experiments with the chemical composition of his clay, and tries out new moulding and firing techniques, glazes and colouring agents.   Imperial Chinese porcelains of the Sung Dynasty (960-1,279) have always been the principal influence upon him. In the course of his research, he invented a secret process for executing incised ornament that greatly accelerated his rate of production.  His prolific output is purely once-off and consists of highly decorative, yet functional, pieces. There are two mainstreams.

From 2000 to 2004, Bauer produced over 4,000 small porcelain bowls.  Each carries exquisite, low-relief, incised decoration portraying lovelorn, winged beings engaged in the romantic quest to find the ideal lover and soul-mate.  The entire suite was signed, dated and numbered, and the sum total formed a continuous narrative, a visual diary, recording the ups and downs of the artist’s daily life, his thoughts, dreams, hopes, and numerous, but never casual, love affairs.  Although the quirky motifs and misspelt inscriptions are often playful and funny, the artist never shied away from the big issues.  Bereavement, loneliness, disappointment and the search for happiness, number amongst his themes, and the melancholy undertow is offset by firm faith in divine providence.
 
These bowls established Bauer’s reputation, and he continues to produce them, though in far smaller quantities. From 2005 onwards, he started to diversify his wares and capitalize on his skill in simulating basketry, knitwear and textiles in plaques, tiles and bowls.  His sources range from lace, crochet and doilies, to netsuke, cameos, oriental lacquer and the relief ornament on coins, medallions and leather.
    
Bauer commemorates traditional hand skills and folk art and the artisanship of the pre-industrial world.  Many pieces pay tribute to the feminine crafts and honour  generations of women who crafted objects to embellish the home and enrich domestic life.  An adoration of women and their old-fashioned virtues informs his entire oeuvre, which glorifies the ‘eternal feminine’ and the redemptive power of love.

John Bauer was named an Emerging Creative at Design Indaba 2009. The South African Museum hosted a John Bauer retrospective in 2012, and both the Slave Lodge (formerly known as the South African Cultural History Museum) in Cape Town, and the William Humphreys Art Gallery in Kimberley, have acquired numerous examples of his work.

References

External links
 "Smashwords – An Emotional Dictionary: I’m Feeling Very Kylie Minogue Today… and Other Emotions" a book by John Bauer
 John Bauer Web Site

1978 births
Living people
South African artists
African potters
People from Port Elizabeth
Artists from Cape Town